

Final standings
Note: GP = Games played, W = Wins, L = Losses, T = Ties, GF = Goals for, GA = Goals against, Pts = Points.

The Calgary Oval X-Treme suspended his activities for the season 2009-10 but will spend the upcoming season (2010–2011) re-establishing a home arena and training returning Olympic team and newly recruited players.

Minnesota won the WWHL Championship.

Clarkson Cup 2010 
participants
March 3, 2010: Of note, the city council of Richmond Hill, Ontario donated $10,000 to the CWHL so that it could host the Clarkson Cup on March 27  at the Elgin Barrow Arena in Richmond Hill.

Semifinals

Finals

Minnesota Whitecaps win the Clakson Cup.

Scoring leaders

Goalie leaders

References

External links
   Western Women's Hockey League

Western Women's Hockey League seasons
WWHL
WW